Vijay (Vicky) Goswami is an Indian drug lord. 

In 2017, Goswami was extradited to the United States from Kenya, where he was residing. He is said to be in business with Zambian drug lord Valden Findlay, with whom he has taken total control of the Sub-Saharan mandrax business; he is said to have imported 12 tonnes of quaaludes into South Africa. 

Vicky Goswami reportedly married Mamta Kulkarni in 2013 but Kulkarni has rejected this claim.

References

Year of birth missing (living people)
Living people
People from Gujarat
Indian drug traffickers
Indian gangsters